Skateboarding competitions at the 2024 Summer Olympics are scheduled to run from 27 July to 7 August at Place de la Concorde, returning to the program for the second time since the sport's official debut three years earlier in Tokyo 2020. With the showcase of youthful talents and the level of competition continually rising, Paris 2024 will witness more skateboarders compete across four medal events (street and park for both men and women) as the roster size gradually expands from 80 in Tokyo to 88.

Qualification

88 quota places are available for eligible skateboarders to compete in Paris 2024. NOCs can enter a maximum of six skateboarders (three men and three women) in each of the two disciplines — street and park. Host nation France reserves four spots with one for each event, while the same amount will be set aside for the eligible NOCs under the Universality rules.

The remainder of the total quota is attributed to a large number of skateboarders based on the total points accrued through the Olympic World Skateboarding ranking list of June 24, 2024. The top twenty eligible skateboarders after three consecutive periods of qualification (June 22 – December 31, 2022; January 1 – December 31, 2023; and January 1 – June 23, 2024) in each gender-based event will be selected by name on the official list of athletes for Paris 2024.

Competition schedule

Medal summary

Medal table

Events

References

 
2024
2024 Summer Olympics events
2024 in roller sports